Marcel André Mouloudji (16 September 1922 – 14 June 1994) was a French singer and actor who was born in Paris and died in Neuilly-sur-Seine. He sang songs written by Boris Vian and Jacques Prévert.

Personal life
Mouloudji was born to Algerian Saïd Mouloudji and Breton Eugénie Roux.

Mouloudji had two children: Grégory Mouloudji with Lilia Lejpune and Annabelle Mouloudji with Nicolle Tessier.

Prizes and Honors 
 1944: Prix de la Pléiade for his novel Enrico
 1953 : Grand Prix du disque de l’Académie Charles-Cros for the song, Comme un p'tit coquelicot.

Partial filmography 

1936: Jenny – Le Chanteur des rues
1936: La guerre des gosses – La Crique
1936: Ménilmontant – Toto
1937: À Venise, une nuit – Le jeune Toto
1937: Claudine at School – Mouloud
1938: Mirages – Groom
1938: Les Disparus de Saint-Agil – Philippe Macroix
1938: Les gaietés de l'exposition
1939: L'Entraîneuse – Le cancre (uncredited)
1939: Le grand élan – Pierrot
1941: L'Enfer des anges – Le jeune Léon
1941: Premier bal – Le télégraphiste
1942: The Strangers in the House – Ephraïm (Amédé) Luska
1943: Les Roquevillard – Le garçon de la pension italienne (uncredited)
1943: Adieu Léonard – Le ramoneur (uncredited)
1943: Vautrin – Calvi (uncredited)
1944: L'Ange de la nuit – Un étudiant (uncredited)
1945: Boule de suif – Un franc-tireur (uncredited)
1945: Les Cadets de l'océan – Passicot
1947: Le Bataillon du ciel – Le Canaque
1947: Les jeux sont faits – Lucien Derjeu
1948: Bagarres – Tête blonde – Angelin
1949: La Maternelle – Paulo
1949: Les Eaux troubles – Ernest
1950: La souricière – Mouton
1950: Blonde – Bernard
1950: Justice est faite – Amadeo, le valet de ferme des Malingré
1951: La maison Bonnadieu – Le chanteur des rues (uncredited)
1951: Gibier de potence – Ernest
1952: Nous sommes tous des assassins – René Le Guen
1952: Trois femmes – Raoul (segment "Mouche")
1952: Jouons le jeu – le chanteur (segment 'L'orgueil')
1953: The Virtuous Scoundrel – Le chanteur
1953: Boum sur Paris – Marcel Mouloudji
1954: Il Letto – Ricky (segment "Riviera-Express")
1954: Tout chante autour de moi – Georges
1957: Jusqu'au dernier – Le forain Quedchi
1958:  – Lucien Donati, dit "Le Niçois"
1959: 58.2/B (Short) – Récitant / Narrator
1959: Llegaron dos hombres – Angel Garcia
1962: La Planque – Georges

Songs
 "Rue de Lappe"
 "Comme un p'tit coquelicot"
 "Un jour tu verras"
 "Le Déserteur"
 "Jouez mariachis"
 "La Chanson de Tessa"
 "Les Rues de Paris"
 "L'Amour, l'Amour, l'Amour"

References

External links
 
 French entry about Marcel Mouloudji

French people of Breton descent
French people of Algerian descent
1922 births
1994 deaths
Male actors from Paris
Singers from Paris
Burials at Père Lachaise Cemetery
20th-century French male actors
20th-century French male singers